The Capri 14 is an American trailerable sailboat that was designed by Barney Lehman and W. D. Schock as a day sailer and first built in 1960.

The Capri 14 is a fixed keel development of the 1958 centerboard Lido 14 sailing dinghy and was developed into the Harbor 14 in 2004.

Production
The design was built by W. D. Schock Corp in the United States, starting in 1960, but it is now out of production.

Design
The Capri 14 is a recreational keelboat, built predominantly of fiberglass, with wood trim. It has a fractional sloop rig, a spooned raked stem, an angled transom, a transom-hung rudder controlled by a tiller and a fixed fin keel. It displaces  and carries  of ballast.

See also
List of sailing boat types

References

Keelboats
Trailer sailers
1960s sailboat type designs
Sailing yachts
Sailboat type designs by Barney Lehman
Sailboat type designs by William D. Schock
Sailboat types built by W. D. Schock Corp